The Association of Greater Manchester Authorities (AGMA) is the local government association for Greater Manchester, a metropolitan county in North West England. It was established in 1986 as a voluntary organisation to represent the ten district councils of Greater Manchester after the Greater Manchester County Council was abolished. AGMA develops policy, lobbies government and others, and runs a range of services designed to make strategic and tangible advances in the standard of living across Greater Manchester. Its Policy and Research Unit is based in Wigan,

The Local Government Act 1985, which abolished the metropolitan county councils of England, delegated the powers of the Greater Manchester County Council to the ten bottom-tier metropolitan district councils but also recognised that some functions—such as public transport, fire and rescue, police, and waste disposal—required co-ordination at a strategic, metropolitan level. In this capacity, AGMA directs the strategic public and social services of Greater Manchester on behalf of the boroughs, such as the Greater Manchester County Record Office, which exhibits elements of the local history of Greater Manchester.

The Executive Board of AGMA is composed of representatives from Greater Manchester's ten metropolitan boroughs, and the Greater Manchester Integrated Transport Authority, the Greater Manchester Police Authority, the Greater Manchester Fire and Civil Defence Authority and the Greater Manchester Waste Disposal Authority, who are all members by subscription. The local authorities of Blackpool, Blackburn with Darwen, Cheshire East and Warrington are associate members with representation at AGMA debates and meetings, but are excluded from voting processes.

AGMA makes representations on behalf of Greater Manchester to the government of the United Kingdom, the North West Development Agency, the European Union, business and other bodies, lobbying for investment and funding. AGMA actively pursued a formal and statutory government structure for Greater Manchester throughout the 2000s and made a successful bid to the UK's central government to constitute Greater Manchester as a Statutory City Region. Although not abolished, AGMA was effectively superseded by the Greater Manchester Combined Authority, the first authority of its kind in the United Kingdom, on 1 April 2011.

History

Background
The Association of Greater Manchester Authorities (AGMA) was established in 1986 following the Local Government Act 1985, which abolished the Greater Manchester County Council. It has operated as a voluntary association representing the collective interests of the local authorities within Greater Manchester and as a joint committee with responsibilities for a number of residual functions previously performed by the Greater Manchester County Council (such as public transport and waste management control). Section 48 of the Local Government Act 1985 provided AGMA and the Greater Manchester County Records Office any functions its constituent councils delegated to it.

Functions and constitution

AGMA has been operating as a joint committee of the 10 Greater Manchester local authorities since its creation in 1986. Under its constitution (passed in 2008), the Executive Board of AGMA coordinates economic development, housing, planning, and together with the relevant statutory bodies, transport policies for Greater Manchester with a supporting structure of seven commissions. However, although the Executive Board has the power to establish the strategic commission, it is not a body corporate, and it has no formal functions in its own right. Those it has to depend on delegations from, or agreements by, its constituent local authorities.

The AGMA Executive meets monthly to deal with strategic issues that impact Greater Manchester. AGMA also provides some joint services across Greater Manchester via AGMA Units and is developing policies and strategic initiatives, including its Greater Manchester Strategy.

As at January 2010, six commissions are in operation, being:

Commission for the New Economy;
Environment;
Improvement & Efficiency;
Health;
Planning & Housing; and
Public Protection.

City region and combined authority

Following a bid from AGMA highlighting the potential benefits in combatting the financial crisis of 2007–2010, it was announced in the 2009 United Kingdom Budget that Greater Manchester and the Leeds City Region would be awarded Statutory City Region Pilot status, allowing (if they desired) for their constituent district councils to pool resources and become statutory Combined Authorities with powers comparable to the Greater London Authority. The aim of the pilot is to evaluate the contributions to economic growth and sustainable development by Combined Authorities. The Local Democracy, Economic Development and Construction Act 2009 enabled the creation of a Combined Authority for Greater Manchester with devolved powers on public transport, skills, housing, regeneration, waste management, carbon neutrality and planning permission, pending approval from the ten councils. Such strategic matters would be decided on via a majority rule voting system involving ten members appointed from among the councillors of the ten metropolitan boroughs (one representing each borough of Greater Manchester with each council also nominating one substitute) without the input of the UK's central government. Committees will be formed from a pool of 33 councillors allocated by council population (roughly one councillor for every 75,000 residents) to scrutinise the running of bodies and their finances, approve the decisions and policies of said bodies and form strategic policy recommendations or projects for the approval of the ten-member panel. The ten district councils of Greater Manchester approved the creation of the Greater Manchester Combined Authority on 29 March 2010, and submitted its final recommendations for its constitution to the Department for Communities and Local Government and the Department for Transport. On 31 March 2010 the Communities Secretary John Denham approved the constitution and launched a 15-week public consultation on the draft bill together with the approved constitution. The Association of Greater Manchester Authorities requested that the new authority should be established in April 2011. The Greater Manchester Combined Authority had its inaugural meeting on 1 April 2011.

Notes

References

External links
www.agma.gov.uk, the website of the Association of Greater Manchester Authorities

Local government in Greater Manchester
Organisations based in Wigan